Time to Burn may refer to:

Time to Burn (Giant album),  1992
 Time to Burn (Taking Dawn album), 2010
 "Time to Burn" (song), a song by The Rasmus from the album Dead Letters
 "Time to Burn", a song by Storm, 2000
 "Time to Burn", a song by Peter Hammill from the album In a Foreign Town
 "Time to Burn", a song by Dio from the album Intermission